Vico Zeljković (born 12 November 1988) is a Bosnian businessman and football executive who is the current president of the Football Association of Bosnia and Herzegovina. He previously served as president of the Football Association of Republika Srpska.

Zeljković was also president of Borac Banja Luka and worked as a board executive in the Bosnian FA.

Career
From 19 June 2018 until 6 August 2020, Zeljković was president of Bosnian Premier League club Borac Banja Luka. He served as president of the Football Association of Republika Srpska from 24 January 2020 until 16 March 2021.

On 16 March 2021, Zeljković became the new president of the Football Association of Bosnia and Herzegovina. Before becoming president, he was a board executive in the Bosnian FA.

Personal life
Zeljković is the nephew of Bosnian Serb politician Milorad Dodik.

References

External links
Vico Zeljković at nfsbih.ba

1988 births
Living people
People from Gradiška, Bosnia and Herzegovina
Serbs of Bosnia and Herzegovina
Bosnia and Herzegovina businesspeople
Bosnia and Herzegovina chairpersons of corporations
FK Borac Banja Luka presidents
Presidents of the Football Association of Bosnia and Herzegovina